Frozen in Love is a 2018 American-Canadian made for television romantic drama film directed by Scott Smith and starring Rachael Leigh Cook and Niall Matter. It was developed from an original idea by Cook. The film was produced by the Hallmark Channel and premiered on their network in the United States on January 13, 2018, as part of their 'Winterfest' season.

Plot

Bookstore owner Mary Cartwright (Rachael Leigh Cook) is struggling to make ends meet in order to keep her bookstore open. Adam Clayborn (Niall Matter) is a hockey player who got booted from his third game due to a disagreement with the referee causing his hockey team's manager/ex-girlfriend Erica Parker (Tammy Gillis) to suspend him from the upcoming hockey games until further notice. Mary is given the opportunity to turn her fortunes round in the form of an image makeover, but must work with Adam Clayborn in return under the supervision of public relations worker Janet Dunleavy (Sandy Sidhu) who has connections with Erica. Can the two overcome their animosity, and mutual attraction, to improve both their images?

Cast
 Rachael Leigh Cook as Mary Campbell
 Niall Matter as Adam Clayborn
 Madison Smith as Tyler Campbell
 Victor Zinck Jr. as Chuck Forman
 Tammy Gillis as Erica Parker
 Sandy Sidhu as Janet Dunleavy
 Jessie Fraser as Sarah Forman
 Sebastian Billingsley-Rodriguez as Graham Forman
 Mason McKenzie as Noah

Development
The film was developed from an original idea by actress Rachael Leigh Cook, who also stars in the film. She had an idea for the plot several years previously, and realized that it could work as a Hallmark Channel project. Along with producer Jim Head, she pitched the idea to the channel in the summer of 2017, and they subsequently picked it up.

In November 2017, Hallmark announced four new original movies, including Frozen in Love, to be broadcast as a part of their 'Winterfest 2018' seasoning of programming in January 2018.

Filming

Filming took place in British Columbia in November and December 2017, with location filming in  Revelstoke downtown, the Revelstoke Forum, Grizzly Plaza and at Revelstoke Mountain Resort. Whilst the bookstore scenes were filmed on a specially built set, the library scenes were filmed in Maple Ridge Public Library.

Broadcast

The film premiered on the Hallmark Channel on January 13, 2018, as part of their Winterfest season of programming.

References

External links

2018 television films
Hallmark Channel original films
English-language Canadian films
Canadian drama television films
Canadian romantic drama films
American romantic drama films
Films shot in British Columbia
American ice hockey films
Canadian ice hockey films
2018 films
American drama television films
2010s American films
2010s Canadian films